The 1991 Team Ice Racing World Championship was the 13th edition of the Team World Championship. The final was held on ?, 1991, in Inzell in Germany. The Soviet Union won their 11th title.

Final Classification

Qualifying 
 Oulu - 26/27 Jan

See also 
 1991 Individual Ice Speedway World Championship
 1991 Speedway World Team Cup in classic speedway
 1991 Individual Speedway World Championship in classic speedway

References 

Ice speedway competitions
World